Nicola Leibinger-Kammüller born Leibinger (born December 15, 1959) is an American-born German businesswoman. She is the president and chairwoman of the Managing Board of the Trumpf GmbH + Co. KG, of which she has been a member since 2003, after having joined the company in 1985 as a public relations and branding specialist.

Early life and education
Leibinger-Kammüller is the daughter of Berthold Leibinger. She holds a doctorate in philology, having studied German, English and Japanese studies in University of Freiburg, University of Vermont and ETH Zurich. She is a dual citizen of Germany and the United States by the virtue of her birth in Ohio.

Career
Leibinger-Kammüller worked in different executive positions for Trumpf, starting in 1984 in the press and public relations department. She worked for Trumpf in Japan for two years, and became managing director of the Berthold Leibinger Foundation in 1992. She was made executive vice-president of Trumpf in 2003, and president and a director of the main board in 2005. She ist responsible for the strategic development of the company, corporate communication, brand management, real estate management and sustainable business, legal affairs, M+A as well as internal risk management. She also has the regional responsibility for China.

Leibinger-Kammüller was a member of the Council for Innovation and Growth and is in the Scientific Commission of the German Council of Science and Humanities. In addition to her role at Trumpf, she also holds, or has held, various board memberships.

Corporate boards
 Die Zeit, Member of the Editorial Board (since 2020)
 Landesbank Baden-Württemberg (LBBW), Member of the Advisory Board
 Allensbach Institute, Member of the Board of Trustees
 Siemens AG, Member of the Supervisory Board (2008–2021)
 Voith, Member of the Supervisory Board (2008–2018)
 Lufthansa, Member of the Supervisory Board (2008–2016)
Axel Springer SE, Member of the Supervisory Board (2010–2019)

Non-profit organizations 
 Federation of German Industries (BDI), Member of the Presidium (since 2021)
 Berlin-Brandenburg Academy of Sciences and Humanities, Member of the Senate
 Cultural Foundation of the Federal States, Member of the Board of Trustees
 Deutsche Nationalstiftung, Member of the Board of Trustees (since 2017)
 Friends of the German Literature Archive Marbach, Chairwoman (since 2016) 
 Technical University of Munich (TUM), Member of the Board of Trustees (since 2013)
 Berthold Leibinger Foundation, Chairwoman of the Board of Trustees
 Foundation for Family Businesses, Member of the Board of Trustees
 Fraunhofer Society, Member of the Senate
 Friedrich August von Hayek Foundation, Member of the Board of Trustees
 Max Planck Society, Member of the Senate
 Robert Bosch Stiftung, Member of the Board of Trustees
 Schule Schloss Salem, Member of the Board of Trustees
 Stifterverband für die Deutsche Wissenschaft, Member of the Board of Trustees
 University of Tübingen, Honorary Senator

Political activities
Leibinger-Kammüller served as a CDU delegate to the Federal Convention for the purpose of electing the President of Germany in 2009 and 2010. In August 2012, she was part of Chancellor Angela Merkel’s delegation on a state visit to China. During the Hannover Messe in April 2016, she was among the 15 German CEOs who were invited to a private dinner with President Barack Obama.

In April 2020, Leibinger-Kammüller was appointed by Minister-President Armin Laschet of North Rhine-Westphalia to a 12-member expert group to advise on economic and social consequences of the COVID-19 pandemic in Germany.

Personal life
Leibinger-Kammüller has been married since 1984 and has four children.

Recognition
 2006: The German Fairness Prize for merits with regards to "a fair and transparent company and management culture", together with her father, Berthold Leibinger, her brother, Peter Leibinger, and her husband, Mathias Kammüller
 2008: The Order of Merit of the Federal Republic of Germany for merits in the areas of business, education and society, and for her civic commitment
 2011: The Hans-Peter Stihl Award for contributions to the development of the Stuttgart region
 2011: The Ring of Honor of the city of Garbsen
 2012: Knight of the Legion of Honour
 2014: McCloy Award
 2015: German Leadership Award
 2015: The Grand Gold Medal of Honor of Upper Austria 
 2015: The Progressive Thinker Award of the Plansecur Company Group
 2015: The Ludwig Erhard Prize for Economic Journalism
 2016: Member of the Handelsblatt Hall of Fame der Familienunternehmen
 2017: Hanns Martin Schleyer Prize 
 2017: Lutherrose
 2019: Ehrenpreis für Familienunternehmen

Publications
 Awakening and Resignation: Erich Kästners Late Works 1945 – 1967, Dissertation, University of Zürich 1988.

External links
 Nicola Leibinger-Kammüller: President and Chairwoman of the Managing Board of the TRUMPF GmbH + Co. KG.

References

1959 births
Living people
Chevaliers of the Légion d'honneur
German chief executives
20th-century German businesswomen
20th-century German businesspeople
Recipients of the Cross of the Order of Merit of the Federal Republic of Germany
Recipients of the Order of Merit of Baden-Württemberg
21st-century German businesswomen
21st-century German businesspeople